Studzionki may refer to the following places in Poland:
Studzionki in Gmina Rudna, Lubin County, Lower Silesian Voivodeship (SW Poland)
Studzionki (Gorce), a hamlet in Pasmo Lubania, Gorce Mountains, Southern Poland